Bland Hayden Campbell (February 7, 1905 - August 30, 1989) was a state legislator in the U.S. state of Mississippi. He served in the Mississippi House of Representatives from 1948 to 1952 and then in the Mississippi Senate from 1956 to 1972. 

He was born in Middlesboro, Kentucky, and moved to Jackson, Mississippi, in 1930. Campbell represented Hinds County as a Democrat in the Mississippi House of Representatives from 1948 to 1952. He represented the 1st District in the Mississippi State Senate from 1956 to 1972. During his tenure in the legislature, Campbell played a key role in the establishment of the University of Mississippi School of Medicine.

He opposed desegregation, stating it opened the doors to "murder and rape". He was a member of the Mississippi Sovereignty Commission and the Jackson Citizens Council. He resigned from the Sovereignty Commission in 1966 protesting its inactivity.

Campbell died on August 30, 1989, in the Lakeland Health Care Center in Jackson, Mississippi.

He had a son Bland Hayden Campbell Jr. and a grandson Bland Hayden Campbell III.

References

1905 births
1989 deaths
Members of the Mississippi House of Representatives
Mississippi state senators
20th-century American politicians